William (died 834) was a magnate in the Frankish Empire during the reign of his first cousin, Louis the Pious. He was the Count of Blois from about 830 and, at the time of his death in battle, was Louis's constable. His brother was Odo, Count of Orléans, and he was also a kinsman of Bernard of Septimania.

In 834, the emperor's son, Lothair rebelled, supported by Count Lambert I of Nantes and Matfrid, the former Count of Orléans. The emperor sent an army against them under the leadership of William and Odo. A battle took place in the Touraine after Whitsunday (25 May), at which both William and Odo died, along with several other notables: a certain Count Fulbert, Count Guy of Maine and Abbot Theoto of Saint-Martin, the imperial archchancellor. The historian Adrevald of Fleury referred to these men as "leaders of war" (ductores belli). Although William is also named in the Annales Bertiniani and the Vita Hludovici, he is not mentioned by Nithard in his account of the battle.

Notes

834 deaths
Counts of Blois
Year of birth unknown
9th-century French people